Centaur Publications is an American comic book company.

Titles

Centaur Publications